The Las Cruces Farmers were a short–lived minor league baseball team based in Las Cruces, New Mexico. The Farmers began in the 1915 season as members of the Class D level Rio Grande Association, before the franchise permanently folded early in the season after compiling a 5–14 record.

History
The 1915 Las Cruces Farmers became charter members of the six–team Class D level Rio Grande Association. The league started the season with the Albuquerque Dukes, Douglas Miners, El Paso Mackmen, Phoenix Senators and Tucson Old Pueblos joining Las Cruces as charter member franchises.

After beginning league play on April 27, 1915, the Farmers folded on May 24, 1915. The Douglas Miners and Las Cruces teams were both dropped from the league on May 24, 1915, due to financial difficulties. The teams' records were 5–13 and 5–14 respectively. Las Cruces compiled their 5–14 record while playing under manager Bill Hurley.

The league continued play with four teams, but folded before the end of the 1915 season. The Rio Grande Association permanently folded on July 5, 1915, with the Phoenix Senators in 1st place.

Las Cruces, New Mexico was without a minor league baseball franchise for nearly a century, before the 2011 Las Cruces Vaqueros began play as members of the Pecos League.

The ballpark
The name of the Las Cruces Farmers' home 1915 minor league ballpark is not known.

Year–by–year record

Notable alumni
Rudy Kallio (1915)
Stoney McGlynn (1915)

See also
Las Cruces Farmers players

References

External links
Baseball Reference

Defunct baseball teams in New Mexico
Baseball teams disestablished in 1915
Baseball teams established in 1915
Las Cruces, New Mexico
Defunct Rio Grande Association teams